Into the Woods is the thirtieth album by space rock band Hawkwind, released on 5 May 2017. It peaked at number 34 in the UK Albums Chart. In an interview with Phil Alexander for Planet Rock, Brock described the album as "a continuation of the story of The Machine Stops".

The group's line-up had stabilised for some time with guitarist/singer Dave Brock, drummer Richard Chadwick and singer Mr Dibs, bassist Haz Wheaton had made a guest appearance on the previous album The Machine Stops replaces Niall Hone here, while guitarist Magnus Martin (whose band Tarantism had often supported Hawkwind) makes his first recorded appearance with the band.

They promoted the album with a UK tour in March through May 2017, which featured an opening set performed acoustically. The Roundhouse main show from 26 May was issued as Hawkwind At The Roundhouse as a 2CD/DVD boxed-set on 8 December, and the group made a promotional appearance playing an acoustic version of "Ascent" on  Matthew Wright's Channel 5 daily morning television programme The Wright Stuff on 1 December.

Track listing

Personnel
Hawkwind
 Mr Dibs – vocals, keyboards, synthesisers
Haz Wheaton – bass guitar, keyboards
 Richard Chadwick – drums, percussion, vocals
Dave Brock – vocals, guitar, keyboards, synthesisers, theremin
 Magnus Martin – keyboards, guitar

References 

2017 albums
Concept albums
Hawkwind albums